Seven Footprints to Satan is a 1929 American mystery film directed by Danish filmmaker Benjamin Christensen. Based on the 1928 story of the same name by Abraham Merritt, it stars Thelma Todd, Creighton Hale, William V. Mong and Sheldon Lewis. It was first released as a silent film and later as a part-talkie.

Plot
Jim and his fiancee Eve, a young society couple, are kidnapped on the eve of Jim's departure for Africa and brought to a mansion that is home to a strange and glamorous cult with a hooded leader called "Satan." Jim is put through a number of strange adventures in the old house and tries to maintain his courage. During the course of the film, Jim encounters an old witch, a dwarf, a gorilla and a strange shaggy creature called "The Spider" (played by Sheldon Lewis). In the end, he is confronted by Satan himself who puts him to a final test. It is revealed to be a hoax played on Jim by his uncle Joe, Eve, and his uncle's employees to convince Jim to forget his adventure plans, stay at home, work for his uncle, and settle down with Eve.

Cast

Production
Seven Footprints to Satan was adapted from the 1928 novel 7 Footprints to Satan by Abraham Merritt. The screenplay was written by director Benjamin Christensen under the name Richard Bee. Initially overjoyed that his story would be adapted into a film, Merritt later spoke about the film in a 1933 interview, stating that he "sat through the picture and wept. The only similarity between the book and the picture was the title. The picture likewise killed the booksale [...] for people who saw the picture felt no impulse thereafter to read the book."

Christensen cast actor Creighton Hale in the role of Jim in an attempt to capitalize on Hale's having starred in The Cat and the Canary, an earlier similar "old dark house" film.

Release
The silent version of the film was released on January 27, 1929 while a version with sound was released on February 17, 1929.

The original running time of Seven Footprints to Satan is in question.  In his book Thrills Untapped: Neglected Horror, Science Fiction and Fantasy Films, 1928-1936, Michael R. Pitts noted that most contemporary reviews stated the film had a 60 minute running time seemingly referring to the sound version of the film. The silent release is listed at being 168 feet shorter than the sound release, with a restored silent version running at around 77 minutes.

Pitts described the film as a "box office flop", with a gross of $129,950.

Critical response
Pitts described that contemporary critics were overall "not impressed" with Seven Footprints to Satan. A review in Film Daily described the film as a "has of weird and wild doings in a mysterious house with a lot of phony thrills." Movie Age opined that "Maybe we haven't seen all the so-called mystery-drama-thrillers so far released, but of those what we have seen, this Seven Footprints to Satan is one of the poorest. There is not a convincing situation in it, and the explanation of it all at the end takes the cake...no rhyme or reason." A review in Variety similarly called the film "all hokum", noting "another of those fright producers, wholly baffling from start to finish. An utterly moronic sound film appealing to all the passions." One reviewer in Photoplay stated that they loved the title of the film but found it "just a hodgepodge mystery story"

A review in Harrison's Reports commented that "People will no doubt enjoy this picture provided they don't take it seriously. It is one of the wildest mystery trapdoor melodramas that has been produced in many a moon."

See also
 List of incomplete or partially lost films

References

Footnotes

External links

 

1929 films
1929 mystery films
American silent feature films
American mystery films
Films directed by Benjamin Christensen
Films based on American horror novels
American black-and-white films
First National Pictures films
1920s American films
Silent mystery films